Turquoise Jeep Records is an independent record label founded by rappers Flynt Flossy and Whatchyamacallit. It is best known for its YouTube videos including "Lemme Smang It" (by Yung Humma featuring Flynt Flossy) and "Did I Mention I Like to Dance." Currently, the label has three albums, titled Keep the Jeep Riding, Existing Musical Beings, and Eclectic Catapilla, as well as four singles.

History
Rappers Flynt Flossy and Whatchyamacallit founded Turquoise Jeep Records and released the label's first song "Stretchy Pants" as a YouTube video on March 15, 2009. The label continued to make music videos and release them to YouTube, signing new artists.

Turquoise Jeep toured throughout 2011–2013 and continued to release new material. Flynt Flossy and Yung Humma also appeared on the track "Fuck Your Blog" by Childish Gambino.

In 2013, the group released a freestyle collaboration with Humma, Flossy, and Whatchyamacallit.

On December 23, 2013, the group released their second album, Existing Musical Beings.

Turquoise Jeep has posted instructional dance videos under the name Flow with the Floss.

Artists
Current members:
 Flynt Flossy
 Whatchyamacallit
 Slick Mahony
 Pierre Cashmere
 Tummiscratch Beats 

Past members:
 Yung Humma
 Pretty Raheem
 MoonRock

Discography
Group albums
 Keep The Jeep Ridin'  (2010)
 Existing Musical Beings (2013)
 Eclectic Catapilla (2017)
Solo albums
 F. Floss InternatioKnown (2015)
 Flynt Flossy - Perplexed Portrait (2020)

References

External links
 
 

American independent record labels